Thomas Culpeper ( – 10 December 1541) was an English courtier and close friend of Henry VIII, and related to two of his queens, Anne Boleyn and Catherine Howard. He is known to have had many private meetings with Catherine after her marriage, though these may have involved political intrigue rather than  nothing. A letter to him was found, written by Queen Catherine and signed, "Yours as long as life endures." Accused of adultery with Henry's young consort, Culpeper denied it and blamed the queen for the situation, saying that he had tried to end his friendship with her, but that she was "dying of love for him". Eventually, Culpeper admitted to intending to sleep with the queen, though he never admitted to having actually done so.

Early life
Thomas Culpeper was the second of the three sons of Alexander Culpeper (d. 1541) of Bedgebury in Kent, and his second wife, Constance Harper. His elder brother, also named Thomas, was a client of Thomas Cromwell. The brothers were known for collecting valuable items for the royal family during their time at court. He was distantly related to the Howard family, who were immensely powerful at the time, being a distant cousin of Joyce Culpeper, Catherine Howard's mother. They were particularly influential after the fall of Cardinal Wolsey in 1529, and for a brief time under the reign of Anne Boleyn, who was one of their cousins.

Royal service
Having bought the Higham Park estate at Bridge in Kent in 1534, by 1535 Culpeper was acting as courtier for the Viscount Lisle and his wife, Honor, during which time he collected a number of items for them. In 1538, Honor presented Culpeper with a hawk and during that same year, Culpeper worked with Richard Cromwell to gain a hawk for King Henry VIII.

Culpeper was described as "a beautiful youth" and he was a great favourite of Henry. It was because of this favouritism that Culpeper had major influence with the King and was often bribed to use his influence on others' behalf. In 1539, a Thomas Culpeper was accused of raping a park-keeper's wife and then murdering a villager. However, there is a possibility that the rapist was Culpeper's elder brother, also called Thomas. Due to similar names, some confusion between the brothers is possible. However, his elder brother, Thomas (born around 1501), may have received a knighthood, as referenced on the Culpeper Family Tree. Whoever was the guilty party, through influence on the King, a pardon was given. Culpeper was given the honour of being keeper of the armoury and Henry eventually made Culpeper a Gentleman of  the Privy Chamber, giving him intimate access to the King, as the role involved dressing and undressing Henry and often sleeping in his bedchamber. He was part of the group of privileged courtiers who greeted Henry's fourth wife Anne of Cleves when she arrived in England for her marriage.

From 1537–1541, Culpeper was given several gifts, including keeper of the manor at Penshurst Palace and property in Kent, Essex, Gloucestershire and Wiltshire.

Supposed affair with Catherine Howard

In 1540, Culpeper caught the attention of Henry's new young bride, Catherine Howard, and by 1541 they were spending time together, often alone and late at night, aided and abetted by Catherine's lady-in-waiting, Lady Rochford, the widowed sister-in-law of Anne Boleyn. The affair caused the downfall of all involved.

Culpeper had close access to the Queen's apartments and often came into contact with the Queen and her attendants. Thomas Culpeper was first introduced into Catherine Howard's personal life in March 1541, Henry went on a trip to Dover and left Catherine behind at Greenwich. At this time Culpeper began asking favours of Catherine.  The private meetings between them are thought to have begun sometime around May of that same year. Lady Rochford, arranged the meetings between Culpeper and Catherine. On these occasions only she and another lady-in-waiting, Katherine Tilney, were allowed entrance to the Queen's chamber.

On 30 June, Catherine and Henry travelled north to York in the hope of meeting James V of Scotland. They arrived at Lincoln on 9 August, where Culpeper met Catherine for another secret meeting in her bedchamber. These meetings continued in Pontefract Castle, after the court arrived on 23 August. It is believed that the letter Catherine sent to Culpeper was sent during these proceedings. In this letter she wishes to know how he is and is troubled that he is ill. Catherine also writes: "I never longed so muche for [a] thynge as I do to se you and to speke wyth you, the wyche I trust shal be shortely now," and "my trust ys allway in you that you wolbe as you have promysed me..."

These statements cause some audiences to believe that their affair was not only one of passion, but also centred on Culpeper's political agenda. With Henry in poor health and only his very young son Edward to succeed him, being Catherine's favourite would undoubtedly have put Culpeper in a very strong political position. As a well-liked member of the King's Privy Chamber he enjoyed a close relationship with Henry. If the promise Catherine mentioned was in reference to his possible knowledge about her previous sexual relationships, Culpeper could have used this as leverage to gain power and control over the Queen herself. In this specific letter Catherine states that she longs to talk with Culpeper but does not mention any desire to be intimate with him, although she does sign off with the dedication, "Yours as long as life endures".

Accounts of the Queen's premarital indiscretions had meanwhile come to the attention of Thomas Cranmer, then Archbishop of Canterbury. During Cranmer's investigations, he came across rumours of an affair between the Queen and Culpeper; Culpeper was soon arrested for questioning. Both he and the Queen denied the allegations, but the letter from Catherine to Culpeper, found during a search of Culpeper's quarters, provided the evidence for which Cranmer was looking. Whether the association between Culpeper and the Queen was ever consummated is still debated by historians, but the letter seems to give evidence of Catherine's feelings for Culpeper. Also in the letter was a reference to Lady Rochford.

Downfall and execution

Culpeper was arrested on orders from King Henry and, in December 1541, was tried for adultery alongside Francis Dereham, who was separately accused of adultery with the Queen before her marriage to Henry. Catherine had not hidden the affair with Culpeper from members of her household, who now testified against her to protect themselves, although many historians believe the affair to be  an untrue allegation.

The Queen was portrayed as having seduced Culpeper at Chenies Palace in Buckinghamshire. With testimony given of private meetings at Hatfield House in Hertfordshire, and during the royal progress to the north of England in the summer of 1541, his fate was sealed.

Under interrogation, Culpeper admitted to intending to have sexual relations with Catherine and that she intended to sleep with him. Lady Rochford, however, stated in her interrogation that she believed that Culpeper had "known the Queen carnally."

Both Culpeper and Dereham were found guilty and sentenced to death. They were both to be hanged, drawn and quartered. Both men pleaded for mercy; Culpeper, presumably because of his former closeness to the King, received a commuted sentence of simple beheading. Dereham received no such mercy.

Culpeper was executed along with Dereham at Tyburn on 10 December 1541, and their heads were put on display on London Bridge. Culpeper was buried at St Sepulchre-without-Newgate church in London. Queen Catherine Howard and Lady Rochford were both executed on 13 February 1542, and were buried in the Church of St Peter ad Vincula, within the Tower of London.

Portrayal
Culpepper is referenced in nearly all biographies of Henry VIII and Catherine Howard. He is less well-represented in popular fiction, where he is often unrepresented except for his relationship with Catherine.  He is portrayed in several plays and several writings, always closely associated with Catherine.

Historiography 
In the book A Tudor Tragedy; The Life and Times of Catherine Howard, by Lacey Baldwin Smith, the author writes that there were rumours during the time period that Thomas Culpeper and Catherine Howard intended to be married before Henry VIII set his sights on her. The book describes Thomas Culpeper as a young man in his 20s, hence his appeal to Catherine, who, during the time of her marriage to Henry VIII, witnessed his steadily declining physical state and overall health.  This was in conjunction with his steadily declining sanity; during his last year with Catherine Howard, Henry VIII was seen as more and more emotionally erratic.

The affair seems to have always attracted the attention of authors who are looking to write about scandal. One such particular writer was a Spanish chronicler who may have been at King Henry VIII's court, who wrote his very romantic – and for the greater part inaccurate – interpretation of Catherine's career. In his version of the story, he portrays King Henry VIII as the cruel, selfish husband, who bullied the unwilling Catherine into marrying him against her will, despite her previous involvement with Thomas Culpeper, who is portrayed as the devoted and heartbroken hero who resisted his love for Catherine for as long as he possibly could, until one day he secretly slipped her a note declaring his love for her. When their love was discovered by the King, Thomas was arrested but, according to the writings, he stated: “Gentlemen, do not seek to know more than that the King deprived me of the thing I loved best in the world, and, though you may hang me for it, I can assure you that she loves me as well as I love her, although up to this hour no wrong has ever passed between us.  Before the King married her, I thought to make her my wife, and when I saw her irremediably lost to me I was like to die.”  According to the story, the Duke of Somerset retorted to this monologue with, "You have said quite enough, Culpeper, to lose your head."

Literature 
In Ford Madox Ford's trilogy on Catherine Howard, entitled The Fifth Queen, Culpeper is portrayed as an intimate of Catherine's who, early on in the novel, arrives with her in tow on a mule as the wedding with Anne of Cleves is about to take place.  In dragging the mule forward as a riot is starting outside the King's garden, he is described as "a man in green at the mule's head, [who] ... sprang like a wild cat under the beast's neck.  His face blazed white, his teeth shone like a dog's, he screamed and struck his dagger through the butcher's throat [someone trying to block his and Catherine's way].  His motions were those of a wild beast". His introduction to Court is brought about through Catherine.  He is sent to Calais to keep him from getting in trouble at Court for his brawling.  He is often mentioned as having sold property to buy his impoverished cousin Catherine a proper dress and is not at all consistent with the historical record.

On-screen portrayals 
In the 1933 film The Private Life of Henry VIII, Culpeper was played by Robert Donat. In the 1970 BBC series The Six Wives of Henry VIII, he was played by Ralph Bates, though Robin Sachs assumed the role in the subsequent 1972 film, Henry VIII and His Six Wives. In the 2003 TV film Henry VIII, Thomas Culpeper is portrayed by Joseph Morgan. In the Showtime television series The Tudors, Thomas Culpeper is portrayed by Torrance Coombs; in this series, he is characterized as a cruel, arrogant man whose interest in Catherine is purely sexual, his relationship with her is an outgrowth of a preexisting affair with Jane Boleyn, Viscountess Rochford (a detail that has no basis in history).

References

1510s births
1539 crimes
1541 deaths
Catherine Howard
Thomas
Court of Henry VIII
English courtiers
Executed people from Kent
Male lovers of royalty
People executed at Tyburn
People executed by Tudor England by decapitation
People executed under Henry VIII
People executed under the Tudors for treason against England
Recipients of English royal pardons
Year of birth uncertain